Millaa Millaa is a rural town and locality in the Tablelands Region, Queensland, Australia.

Geography

The town is known for the Millaa Millaa Falls, the Millaa Millaa lookout and rolling green meadows that enjoy high rainfall.

History
Millaa Millaa was built on the traditional lands of the Dyirbal.

The name Millaa Millaa is probably a corruption of a Yindinji language term millai millai, probably referring to a fruit-bearing plant Elaeagnus latifolia. It is a vine with a similar habit to Bougainvillea, somewhat sprawling all over the place.

Millaa Millaa State School opened on 7 October 1918. It celebrated its centenary in 2018.

The Post Office opened by 1919 (a receiving office had been open from 1914).

Woolley's Road State School opened on 19 May 1919. In 1923 it was renamed Ellinjaa Road State School. It closed in 1949. It was at Ellinjaa Road at approx .

Innisfail Road State School (via Millaa Millaa) opened on 1924 and closed circa 1926.

Millaa Millaa butter factory opened on 1 May 1930 by James Kenny, Member of the Queensland Legislative Assembly for Cook.

On Sunday 26 September 1937 St Rita's Catholic Church was officially opened and blessed by Bishop John Heavey.

At the end of 1945, the Middlebrook Road State School in neighbouring Middlebrook closed and its school building was relocated to Millaa Millaa State School and a bus service was provided to transport the students from Middlebrook to Millaa Millaa to attend school each day.

Millaa Millaa Library opened in 2002.

Heritage listings
Millaa Millaa has a number of heritage-listed sites, including Millaa Millaa Falls.

Education 
Millaa Millaa State School is a government primary (Prep-6) school for boys and girls at 1 Beech Street on the corner with Palm Avenue. In 2017, the school had an enrolment of 75 students with 6 teachers (5 full-time equivalent) and 7 non-teaching staff (5 full-time equivalent). It includes a special education program.

There is no secondary school in Millaa Millaa. The nearest secondary schools are in Malanda and Ravenshoe.

Amenities 
Tablelands Regional Council operates Millaa Millaa Library at 10 Main Street.

The Millaa Millaa branch of the Queensland Country Women's Association meets at the QCWA Hall at 9 Palm Avenue.

St Rita of Cascia's Catholic Church is at 21 Coral Street. It is within the Malanda Parish of the Roman Catholic Diocese of Cairns.

See also 
 Millaa Millaa Falls
 List of reduplicated Australian place names

References

External links 

 
 Town map of Millaa Millaa, 1983
 Tablelands Regional Council
 Milla Milla community website

Towns in Queensland
Populated places in Far North Queensland
Tablelands Region
Localities in Queensland